Inter-alpha-trypsin inhibitor heavy chain H2 is a protein that in humans is encoded by the ITIH2 gene.

It is known to contain a Gla domain, and thus be dependent for production on post translational modification requiring vitamin K. Its function is also presumably dependent on calcium ions.

See also 
 Inter-alpha-trypsin inhibitor
 ITIH1
 ITIH3
 ITIH4

References

Further reading